Charles Knightley is a cricketer.

Charles Knightley may also refer to:

Sir Charles Knightley, 2nd Baronet (1781–1864), MP and baronet
Charles Finch-Knightley, 11th Earl of Aylesford